Conrad William Eden, TD (1905–1995) was an English cathedral organist, who served in Wells Cathedral and Durham Cathedral.

He was born in 1905 in Alton, Hampshire, and was a chorister at Wells Cathedral. He won a scholarship to Rugby School, another to the Royal College of Music and an exhibition which took him to St John's College, Oxford, as college organist. A short period as organist of St. Philip and St. James and director of music at the Dragon School, Oxford, ended with a fractured skull. After his recovery he went as assistant organist at Wells Cathedral where in 1933 he was appointed organist and master of the choristers. In 1936, he moved to Durham Cathedral.

Assistant organist of:
Wells Cathedral 1927–1933

Organist of:
Wells Cathedral 1933–1936
Durham Cathedral 1936–1974

References

English classical organists
British male organists
Cathedral organists
1905 births
1995 deaths
Alumni of St John's College, Oxford
People educated at Rugby School
20th-century classical musicians
20th-century English musicians
20th-century organists
20th-century British male musicians
Male classical organists